Krishan Chander (23 November 1914 – 8 March 1977) was an Indian Urdu and Hindi writer of short stories and novels. Some of his works have also been translated in English. He was a prolific writer, penning over 20 novels, 30 collections of short stories and scores of radio plays in Urdu, and later, after partition in 1947, took to writing in Hindi as well. He also wrote screen-plays for Bollywood movies to supplement his meagre income as an author of satirical stories. Krishan Chander's novels (including the classic: Ek Gadhe Ki Sarguzasht,  'Autobiography of a Donkey') have been translated into over 16 Indian languages and some foreign languages, including English.

His short story "Annadata" ( The Giver of Grain – an obsequious appellation used by Indian peasants for their feudal land-owners), was made into the film Dharti Ke Lal (1946) by Khwaja Ahmad Abbas – which led to his being offered work regularly as a screenwriter by Bollywood, including such popular hits as Mamta (1966) and Sharafat (1970). He wrote his film scripts in Urdu.

Early life and education
Krishan Chander was born in Bharatpur, Rajasthan where his father worked as a doctor. The family originally belonged to Wazirabad District Gujranwala, of undivided Punjab, India. Chander spent his childhood in Poonch, in the state of Jammu and Kashmir, where his father worked as the physician of Maharaja Poonch. His novel Shakast (Defeat) is related to Kashmir's partition. Mitti Ke Sanam one of his most popular novel is about the childhood memories of a young boy who lived with his parents in Kashmir. His another memorable novel is "Gaddar", which is about the partition of India and Pakistan in 1947. In this novel, he brilliantly picturised the sufferings of the people during that time through a selfish young man's feelings, who himself was a gaddar (betrayer). His short stories are the stories of Kashmiri villages, as well as those of displaced expatriates and rootless urban man. He used Pahari (dialect of people living in Poonch) words while writing in Urdu.

In the 1930s, he studied at Forman Christian College, Lahore and edited the English section of the college house magazine, and was at that time interested in English writings. As the then editor of the Urdu section of the magazine, Mehr Lal Soni Zia Fatehabadi was instrumental to his career in having got published, in the year 1932, Chander's first Urdu short story, "Sadhu".

Career
His literary masterpieces on the Bengal famine and the savagery and barbarism that took place at the time of the partition of India in 1947 are some of the finest specimens of modern Urdu literature, but at other times, too,  he continued relentlessly to critique the abuse of power, poverty and the suffering of the wretched of the earth; but above all he never stopped protesting casteism, fanaticism, communal violence and terror. He was a humanist and a cosmopolitan.

Books written by Krishan Chander 
He has been described as the "author of more than 100 books including novels, collections of short stories, plays, fantasies, satires, parodies, reportages, film-scripts and books for children", which include:

Novels:
 Jamun Ka Peid
 Shikast
 Jab Khet Jagay
 Toofaan Ki KaliyaaN
 Dil Ki Waadiyaan So GayiN
 Aasmaan Roushan Hai
 Bavan Patte
 Ek Gadhe Ki Sarguzasht (The Life Story a Donkey)
 Ek Aurat Hazaar Deewanay
 Ghaddaar
 Jab Khet Jage
 Sarak Wapas Jaati Hai
 Dadar Pul Ke Neechay
 Barf Ke Phool
 Borban Club
 Meri Yaadon Ke Chinaar
 Gadhay Ki Wapasi
 Chandi Ka Ghaao
 Ek Gadha Nefa Mein
 Hong Kong Ki Haseena
 Mitti Ke Sanam
 Zar Gaon Ki Raani
 Ek Voilon Samundar Ke Kinare
 Dard Ki Nahar
 London Ke Saat Rang
 Kaghaz Ki Naao
 Filmi Qaaida
 Panch Loafer (1966)
 Panch Loafer Ek Heroine
 Ganga Bahe Na Raat
 Dusri Barfbari Se Pahlay
 Gwalior Ka Hajjam
 Bambai Ki Shaam
 Chanda Ki Chandni
 Ek Karor Ki Botal
 Maharani
 Pyar Ek Khushbu
 Masheenon Ka Shahr
 Carnival
 Aayine Akelay Hain
 Chanbal Ki Chanbeli
 Uska Badan Mera Chaman
 Muhabbat Bhi Qayamat Bhi
 Sone Ka Sansaar
 SapnoN Ki Waadi
 Aadha Raasta
 Honolulu Ka Rajkumar
 Sapnon Ki Rahguzarein
 Footpath Ke Farishtay
 Aadhe Safar Ki Poori Kahani

Short Story Collection
 Tilism E Khayal
 Ekk Tawaef Ka Khat 
 Nazaray
 Hawai Qilay
 Ghunghat Mein Gori Jalay
 Tootay Hue Taaray
 Zindagi Ke Mor Per
 Naghmay Ki Maut
 Purane Khuda
 Ann Daata
 Teen Ghunday
 Hum Wahshi Hain
 Ajanta Se Aagay
 Ek Girja Ek Khandaq
 Samunder Door Hai
 Shikast Ke Baad
 Naye Ghulam
 Main Intezaar Karunga
 Mazaahiya Afsaanay
 Ek Rupiya Ek Phool
 Eucalyptus Ki Daali
 Hydrogen Bomb Ke Baad
 Naye Afsaanay (1943)
 Kaab Ka Kafan
 Dil Kisi Ka Dost Nahi (1959)
 Muskuraane Waaliyan
 Krishn Chander Ke Afsaanay
 Sapnon Ka Qaidi
 Miss Nanital
 DaswaaN Pul (1964)
 Gulshan Gulshan Dhundha Tujhko
 Aadhe Ghante Ka Khuda
 Uljhi Larki Kaalay Baal (1970)
 Kaloo Bhangi

Filmography
 Dharti Ke Lal (1946)  story
 Andolan (1951)  screenplay and story
 Tamasha (1952)  dialogue
 Dev Anand in Goa (1955)  screenplay and dialogue
 Do Phool (1958)  dialogue
 Delhi Junction (1960)  dialogue
 Mamta (1966)  dialogues
 Sharafat (1970)  screenplay and dialogue
 Do Chor (1972)  dialogue
 Manchali (1973)  dialogue
 Hamrahi (1974)  story and dialogue writer
 Ram Bharose  (1977)  dialogue

Personal life and legacy
Krishan Chander Chopra had married twice. His first wife was Vidyawati Chopra, a lady from a decent family belonging to his own community, and the match was arranged by their families in the usual Indian way. They had three children together, two daughters and one son.

Chander later took a second wife, and he was her second husband. This was a divorced Muslim woman, Salma Siddiqui, daughter of Rasheed Ahmed Siddiqi, an Urdu academic. Siddiqui was the mother of a son born of her earlier marriage, and the boy was raised in Chander's household. No children were born of the relationship between Chander and Siddiqui.

Krishan Chander died working at his desk in Mumbai on 8 March 1977. He had just started to write a satirical essay entitled Adab baray-e-Batakh (Literature for a duck), and wrote just one line Noorani ko bachpan hi se paltoo janwaron ka shauq tha. Kabootar, bandar, rang barangi chiriyaan… (since childhood Noorani was fond of pet animals such as pigeons, monkeys, multi-coloured birds…). Before he could complete the sentence, he succumbed to a massive heart attack.

A Fountain Park in the town of Poonch in Jammu and Kashmir has been renamed Krishan Chander Park, Poonch in his memory. His statue has also been erected in the middle of that garden.

References

External links
 
 Indiaclub 
 Krishn Chander Books online

1914 births
1977 deaths
Urdu-language short story writers
Hindi-language writers
Punjabi people
Indian male novelists
Urdu-language writers from India
Forman Christian College alumni
Indian male dramatists and playwrights
Indian male screenwriters
Indian People's Theatre Association people
20th-century Indian novelists
20th-century Indian dramatists and playwrights
Novelists from Punjab, India
People from Wazirabad
Screenwriters from Punjab, India
20th-century Indian male writers
20th-century Indian screenwriters